Tomáš Surový (born September 24, 1981) is a Slovak professional ice hockey left winger currently playing for Slovan Bratislava of the Kontinental Hockey League (KHL).

Playing career
As a youth, Surový played in the 1995 Quebec International Pee-Wee Hockey Tournament with a team from Bratislava.

Surový was drafted in the fourth round, 120th overall, by the Pittsburgh Penguins in the 2001 NHL Entry Draft. He called-up from Pittsburgh's American Hockey League (AHL) affiliate, the Wilkes-Barre Penguins, in December 2005, where he earned the nickname "Killer" after jumping to Sidney Crosby's defence in a game against the Ottawa Senators.

The Penguins decided against re-signing him following the 2005–06 season and he signed with Luleå HF of the Swedish Elitserien.

On May 24, 2007, it became official that Surový had signed a deal with Linköpings HC, also of the Elitserien.

On July 9, 2007, Surový signed with the Phoenix Coyotes. However, his contract with Phoenix was cancelled and he returned to Linköpings HC on September 26, 2007.

On October 2009, Sureý signed a one-year contract with Skellefteå AIK of the Elitserien. After scoring 23 points in 48 games in the 2009–10 season, in July 2010, he moved to Latvia to join Kontinental Hockey League (KHL) club Dinamo Riga.

On June 7, 2013, Surový joined his fourth successive KHL club after signing a one-year contract with Dinamo Minsk.

Career statistics

Regular season and playoffs

International

References

External links

1981 births
Living people
Dinamo Riga players
HC CSKA Moscow players
HC Dinamo Minsk players
HK Poprad players
HC Lev Praha players
Ice hockey players at the 2006 Winter Olympics
Ice hockey players at the 2014 Winter Olympics
Ice hockey players at the 2018 Winter Olympics
Linköping HC players
Luleå HF players
Olympic ice hockey players of Slovakia
Sportspeople from Banská Bystrica
Pittsburgh Penguins draft picks
Pittsburgh Penguins players
Skellefteå AIK players
Slovak ice hockey centres
Wilkes-Barre/Scranton Penguins players
Expatriate ice hockey players in Belarus
Expatriate ice hockey players in Latvia
Slovak expatriate ice hockey players in the Czech Republic
Slovak expatriate ice hockey players in the United States
Slovak expatriate sportspeople in Belarus
Slovak expatriate ice hockey players in Sweden
Slovak expatriate ice hockey players in Russia
Slovak expatriate sportspeople in Latvia